The Department of Trade and Industry (DTI) was a United Kingdom government department formed on 19 October 1970. It was replaced with the creation of the Department for Business, Enterprise and Regulatory Reform and the Department for Innovation, Universities and Skills on 28 June 2007.

History
The department was first formed on 19 October 1970 with the merger of the Board of Trade and the Ministry of Technology, creating a new cabinet post of Secretary of State for Trade and Industry. The new department also took over the Department of Employment's former responsibilities for monopolies and mergers. In January 1974, the department's responsibilities for energy production were transferred to a newly created Department of Energy. On 5 March that year, following a Labour Party victory in the February 1974 general election, the department was split into the Department of Trade, the Department of Industry and the Department of Prices and Consumer Protection.

Reformation
In 1983 the departments of Trade and Industry were reunited.  The Department of Energy was re-merged back into the DTI in 1992, but various media-related functions transferred to the Department of National Heritage. Until it was succeeded in June 2007 the DTI continued to set the energy policy of the United Kingdom.

After the 2005 general election the DTI was renamed to the Department for Productivity, Energy and Industry, but the name reverted to Department of Trade and Industry less than a week later, after widespread derision, including some from the Confederation of British Industry.

Structure
The DTI had a wide range of responsibilities. There were ultimately nine main areas covered by the DTI:
 Company Law
 Trade
 Business Growth
 Innovation
 Employment Law
 Regional Economic Development
 Energy
 Science
 Consumer Law.

Emergent technology
From 1999 to 2005 it led the national E-Commerce Awards with InterForum, a not for profit membership organisation that helped British businesses to trade electronically. This aimed to encourage Small and Medium-Sized Enterprises to develop their business through the use of E-Commerce technologies.

Corporate policing
It also had responsibility for investigating misconduct by company directors, in which role Private Eye repeatedly lampooned it as "the Department of Timidity and Inaction".

See also
 Avanti (project)
 Energy in the United Kingdom
 Restricted Enforcement Unit
 United Kingdom budget
 Business Link – set up by the DTI in 1993
 UK Trade & Investment – set up in 1999
 Special Representative for International Trade and Investment

References

External links
 Department of Trade and Industry (Archive)
 DTI Website Archived on 6 June 2007
 Friends of the Action Group
 DTI e-commerce awards

Video clips
 Enterprise Initiative

Trade and Industry
Economy of the United Kingdom
Government agencies disestablished in 2007
Industry in the United Kingdom
Innovation in the United Kingdom
Ministries established in 1970
1970 establishments in the United Kingdom
Trade in the United Kingdom